Miss USA World 1966 was the 5th edition of the Miss USA World pageant and it was held at the Ohio State Fairgrounds in Columbus, Ohio and was won by Denice Estelle Blair of Utah. She was crowned by outgoing titleholder, Dianna Lynn Batts of the District of Columbia. Blair went on to represent the United States at the Miss World 1966 Pageant in London later that year. She finished as 6th Runner-Up at Miss World.

This year was also significant as, this was the last year that the pageant was called Miss USA World. From 1967 onward, the pageant would be called Miss World USA until 1978.

Results

Placements

Special awards

Delegates
The Miss USA World 1966 delegates were:

 Boston, MA - Peggy Eckert
 Brooklyn, NY - Linda Cumbo
 California - Alexa Clark
 Chicago, IL - Pat Adair
 Cleveland, OH - Janice Galub
 Colorado - Unknown
 Connecticut - Janice Shilinski
 Detroit, MI - Unknown
 District of Columbia - Unknown
 Florida - Christine Anne Fisher
 Hawaii - Ann Marie
 Idaho - Lana Aloha Clark
 Illinois - Lois Scott
 Indiana - Bonnie Barkley
 Iowa - Unknown
 Kansas - Marla Jean Gartin
 Kentucky - Nanette Marchel
 Long Branch, NJ - Charleen Miller
 Los Angeles, CA - Gigi Dahl
 Louisiana - Unknown
 Maryland - Unknown
 Massachusetts - Unknown
 Michigan - Johneane Teeter
 Missouri - Eva Sugarbaker
 Nebraska - Stacey Porter
 Nevada - Unknown
 New Hampshire - Unknown
 New Jersey - Pamela Donaldson
 New Mexico - Jane Nelson
 New York - Sherry Lyn Armbruster
 New York City, NY - Carol Collins
 North Carolina - Ann Elizabeth Bailey
 North Dakota - Cheri Paul Knutson
 Ohio - Cindy Oliver
 Pennsylvania - Unknown
 Philadelphia, PA - Unknown
 Rhode Island - Unknown
 South Carolina - Linda Parrish
 Tennessee - Bettye Jean Dillon
 Texas - Unknown
 Utah - Denice Estelle Blair
 Vermont - Arlene Giroux
 Virginia - Patricia Rae Shaper
 Washington - Unknown
 West Virginia - Barbara Owens
 Wisconsin - Ellen Rombs
 Wyoming - Penny Lee Silva

Notes

Did not Compete

Crossovers
Contestants who competed in other beauty pageants:

Miss USA
1964: : Johneane Teeter
1965: : Jane Nelson (1st Runner-Up; as )
1966: : Denice Estelle Blair (Top 15)

Miss America
1965: : Jane Nelson (Top 10)

References

External links
Miss World Official Website
Miss World America Official Website

1966 in the United States
World America
1966
1966 in Ohio